E-HRM is the planning, implementation and application of information technology for both networking and supporting at least two individual or collective actors in their shared performing of HR activities.

E-HRM is not same as HRIS (Human resource information system) which refers to ICT systems used within HR departments. Nor is it the same as V-HRM or Virtual HRM - which is defined by Lepak and Snell as "...a network-based structure built on partnerships and typically mediated by information technologies to help the organization acquire, develop, and deploy intellectual capital."

E-HRM is in essence the devolution of HR functions to management and employees. They access these functions typically via intranet or other web-technology channels. The empowerment of managers and employees to perform certain chosen HR functions relieves the HR department of these tasks, allowing HR staff to focus less on the operational and more on the strategic elements of HR, and allowing organisations to lower HR department staffing levels as the administrative burden is lightened. It is anticipated that, as E-HRM develops and becomes more entrenched in business culture, these changes will become more apparent, but they have yet to be manifested to a significant degree. A 2007 CIPD survey states that "The initial research indicates that much-commented-on development such as shared services, outsourcing and e-HR have had relatively little impact on costs or staff numbers".

Types         

There are three types of E-HRM. These are described respectively as Operational, Relational and Transformational. 
Operational E-HRM is concerned with administrative functions - payroll and employee personal data for example. 
Relational E-HRM is concerned with supporting business processes by means of training, recruitment, performance management and so forth. 
Transformational E-HRM is concerned with strategic HR activities such as knowledge management, strategic re-orientation. An organisation may choose to pursue E-HRM policies from any number of these tiers to achieve their HR goals.

Goals
E-HRM is seen as offering the potential to improve services to HR department clients (both employees and management), improve efficiency and cost effectiveness within the HR department, and allow HR to become a strategic partner in achieving organizational goals.

Traditionally HR goals have been broken into three categories: maintaining cost effectiveness, the enhancement of service for internal customers, and addressing the tactics of the business.  With e-HRM there is a fourth goal added to the three categories and that is the improvement of global orientation of human resource management.  HR functions that e-HRM assist with are the transactional and transformational goals.  Transactional goals help reduce costs and transformational goals help the allocation of time improvement for HR professionals so that they may address more strategic issues.  To add to this operational benefits have become an outcome of the implementation of e-HRM.  The process of payroll is an example of this, with HR being able to have more transactions with fewer problems.  E-HRM has increased efficiency and helped businesses reduce their HR staff through reducing costs and increasing the overall speed of different processes.  E-HRM also has relational impacts for a business; enabling a company's employees and managers with the ability to access HR information and increase the connectivity of all parts of the company and outside organizations.   This connectivity allows for communication on a geographic level to share information and create virtual teams.   Moreover, e-HRM creates standardization, and with standardized procedures this can ensure that an organization remains compliant with HR requirements, thus also ensuring more precise decision-making. Finally, research has begun to examine the links between e-HRM and perceived labour productivity both directly and through the mediating role of HR service quality.

See also 
 Human resource management

References

Human resource management
Information technology management

6.  Shahreki, J., Ganesan, J., Raman, K., Chin, A.L.L. and Chin, T.S. (2019) 'The Effect of Human Resource Information System Application On Employee Satisfaction And Turnover Intention', Entrepreneurship And Sustainability Issues, Volume 7 Number 2, 1462-1479 (https://doi.org/10.9770/jesi.2019.7.2(47).